The Museum of Science & Industry (Tampa) honors a Hispanic scientist every year since 2001. MOSI awards a Scientist every year to provide role models for the diverse youth of the Tampa Bay area.

2001
The 2001 honoree was Dr. Alejandro Acevedo-Gutierrez, a Marine Biologist from Mexico.

2002
The 2002 honoree was Fernando "Frank" Caldeiro, a NASA Astronaut from Argentina.

2003
The 2003 honoree was Dr. Mario Molina, a Nobel Laureate in Chemistry from Mexico.

2004
Dr. Antiona Coello Novello was the 2004 honoree, and she was the U.S. Surgeon General from 1990 to 1993.  She is originally from Puerto Rico.

2005
Dr. Edmond Yunis was the 2005 honoree, and he is an Immunologist from Colombia.

2006
The 2006 honoree was Dr. Ines Cifuentes, a Seismologist from England, Ecuador, and America.

2007
Dr. Louis A. Martin-Vega is an Industrial Engineer from America and Puerto Rico, and he was the 2007 honoree.

2008
The 2008 honoree was Dr. Lydia Villa-Komaroff, a Molecular Biologist from America and Mexico.

2009
Dr. Nils Diaz, the former chair of the U.S. Nuclear Regulatory Commission, was the 2009 honoree, and he is from Cuba.

2010
Dr. Dan Arvizu, the 2010 honoree, is the Director and Chief Executive of the U.S. Department of Energy's National Renewable Energy Laboratory, and he is from Mexico.

2011
Dr. Cristian Samper, Director of the Smithsonian Institution's National Museum of Natural History, was the 2011 honoree, and he is from Colombia.

2012
Dr. Nora Volkow, the Director of the National Institute on Drug Abuse (NIDA) at the National Institutes of Health, was the 2012 honoree, and she is originally from Mexico.

2013
Dr. Raul Cuero, Inventor and Microbiologist, is the 2013 honoree, and he is from Colombia 
.

2014
Dr. Rafael L. Bras, Civil Engineer, Puerto Rico.
Prize expanded to include an Early Career Honoree: Dr. Ana Maria Rey, Physicist, Colombia.

2015
Dr. Modesto Alex Maidique, Electrical Engineer, Cuba.
Early Career Honoree: Dr. Miguel Morales Silva, Physicist, Puerto Rico.

2016
Dr. Adriana Ocampo, Planetary Geologist, USA.

References

Science and technology awards